That El Emad Towers (Arabic: أبراج ذات العماد)  are 5 towers in Tripoli, Libya. It is located in the El Saddi district of Tripoli in the downtown area. The building began construction in early 1984 and opened in 1990. It was built by a South Korean Daewoo Engineering & Construction. The complex is made up of 5 towers each having 18 floors and full view of the sea. It was built during Muammar Gaddafi's government. The business is currently closed due to Coronavirus.

External links
 That El Emad Towers in the Emporis database

Buildings and structures in Tripoli, Libya